Emilio Sánchez and Slobodan Živojinović were the defending champions, but Sánchez did not participate this year.  Živojinović partnered Boris Becker, withdrawing prior to their semifinals match.

Todd Woodbridge and Mark Woodforde won the title, defeating Libor Pimek and Michiel Schapers 6–3, 6–0 in the final.

Seeds

  Guy Forget /  Jakob Hlasek (first round)
  Patrick Galbraith /  Todd Witsken (quarterfinals)
  Omar Camporese /  Javier Sánchez (first round)
  Todd Woodbridge /  Mark Woodforde (champions)

Draw

Draw

References
Draw

1991 ATP Tour
Donnay Indoor Championships